Charles Wayne Dowdy (born July 27, 1943) is an American politician, lawyer and jurist from Mississippi. He was first elected in a 1981 special election and served four terms in the United States House of Representatives. He later served as chairman of the Mississippi Democratic Party.

Early life
Dowdy was born in Fitzgerald, Ben Hill County, Georgia. He grew up in the Methodist Church and is a graduate of Millsaps College in Jackson, Mississippi. He set up a law practice in Mississippi and purchased two local radio stations. He entered politics and was elected as mayor of McComb, Mississippi, serving from 1978 to 1981.

Political career

On July 7, 1981, Dowdy was elected to the House of Representatives as a Democrat in a special election for the 4th District. In this election the Democrats recaptured a Southern district from the Republicans, in a period when the white electorate in the South was shifting to the Republican Party. Dowdy carefully managed to avoid drawing strong Republican challengers in the general election or African-American opponents in the Democratic primary.

He won re-election narrowly in 1982 and 1984, with 53 percent and 55 percent of the vote, before being re-elected with 72 percent of the vote in the 1986 elections. He was notable for being a rather progressive Democrat by Mississippi standards of the time; in 1982 he voted for renewal of the Voting Rights Act. He built a large base in the African-American community, important in a district with 37 percent African-American population.

In 1988, when John Stennis retired from the Senate, Dowdy won the Democratic nomination. His opponent was Republican House Minority Whip Trent Lott. Dowdy was unable to implement his rural strategy and lost to Lott by a 54 percent-45 percent margin. He was severely hampered by George H. W. Bush carrying Mississippi with a 59 percent to 39 percent margin. He also lost badly in Lott's 5th congressional district, taking only 30 percent of the vote. Despite several Bush voters splitting their tickets to vote for Dowdy, it was not enough to overcome the Republican tide.

Dowdy attempted to stage a comeback against Governor Ray Mabus in the 1991 Democratic gubernatorial primary, but lost with 41 percent of the vote. Dowdy later expressed regret for challenging Mabus, saying the governor "had some good achievements as governor, and frankly, I think that our spirited primary contributed to his loss for re-election."

Post-political career
He returned and resumed his law practice in Magnolia, Mississippi. He practiced civil and trial law and represented Pike County and its Board of Supervisors, the City of Magnolia, and the Town of Summit.

He was elected and served as Chairman of the Mississippi Democratic Party from 2004 to 2008.

He served as City Attorney of McComb, Mississippi from 2009 to 2018.

Personal life
Dowdy is a Methodist. His wife, Susan is from Grenada, Mississippi. They have three children.

He practices law in Magnolia, Mississippi. His family owns several radio stations in Mississippi and Louisiana and is a former staff announcer for television station WJTV-TV in Jackson, Mississippi.

References

Works cited

External links

1943 births
Living people
Mayors of places in Mississippi
Mississippi state court judges
Municipal judges in the United States
State political party chairs of Mississippi
People from Fitzgerald, Georgia
People from McComb, Mississippi
Democratic Party members of the United States House of Representatives from Mississippi
Southern Methodists
American United Methodists
Candidates in the 1988 United States elections
20th-century American politicians